Henry Frank Gornicki (January 14, 1911 – February 16, 1996) was a Major League Baseball pitcher. He played all or part of four seasons in the Majors, 1941 to 1943 and 1946, for the St. Louis Cardinals, Chicago Cubs, and Pittsburgh Pirates.

From 1944 to 1945, Gornicki served in the military during World War II.

References

External links

Major League Baseball pitchers
St. Louis Cardinals players
Chicago Cubs players
Pittsburgh Pirates players
Daytona Beach Islanders players
Asheville Tourists players
Decatur Commodores players
Columbus Red Birds players
Rochester Red Wings players
Hollywood Stars players
Gainesville Owls players
Indianapolis Indians players
Baseball players from New York (state)
1911 births
1996 deaths
United States Army personnel of World War II
United States Army soldiers
Sportspeople from Niagara Falls, New York
Florence Steelers players